The 2018 Maluku gubernatorial election was held on 27 June 2018 to determine the Governor and Deputy Governor of Maluku. The election took place simultaneously with other regional elections in 2018. Incumbent governor Said Assagaff ran for his second term in office against Commander of the Police Mobile Brigade Corps Murad Ismail. Murad managed to defeat Said, becoming governor on 24 April 2019.

Candidates 
Under Indonesia's election regulations, only political parties that have 20% or more of the seats in the Maluku People's Representative Council can nominate candidates. Political parties with less seats can nominate candidates only if they have obtained support from other political parties or through independent channels.

Declared

Results

Quick count

LSI Denny JA 

 Murad Ismail-Barnabas Orno: 40,22%

 Said Assagaff-Anderias Rentanubun: 31,48%
 Herman Koedoeboen-Abdullah Vanath: 28,30%.

KCI-LSI Network 

 Murad Ismail-Barnabas Orno: 40,63%

 Said Assagaff-Anderias Rentanubun: 32,10%
 Herman Koedoeboen-Abdullah Vanath: 27,27%.

Official results

Total

By regency and city

References 

2018 Indonesian gubernatorial elections